Willis Thomas Koenigsmark (February 27, 1896 – July 1, 1972) was a Major League Baseball pitcher who played one game in  with the St. Louis Cardinals. 

Koenigsmark, who batted and threw right-handed, came in as a reliever in the top of the eighth on September 10, 1919 against the Brooklyn Robins with an 11-2 lead.  He walked a batter, then gave up two consecutive hits -- and was then relieved, and never played in the majors again.  The Cardinals hung on to win the game 11-8, in front of a crowd of only 500 fans.  As two of the runners Koenigsmark allowed came around to score, Koenigsmark retired with an ERA of infinity.

He was born in Belleville, Illinois, and died in Waterloo, Illinois.

External links

1896 births
1972 deaths
Major League Baseball pitchers
Baseball players from Illinois
St. Louis Cardinals players
People from Belleville, Illinois
People from Waterloo, Illinois
Columbia Comers players
Houston Buffaloes players
Spartanburg Pioneers players